The DINFIA IA 45 Querandi was a 1950s Argentine twin-engined light transport aircraft built by the DINFIA.

Development
The IA 45 Querandi was designed as a twin engined light transport suitable for both private and as an air taxi. Work began on the new project in 1954, with work being suspended in 1955 and restarted in 1956. A twin-engined all metal high-wing cantilever monoplane with an upswept rear fuselage, it had a tailplane with two fins and rudders and retractable tricycle landing gear. It was powered by two pusher configuration piston engines. The first prototype, powered by  Lycoming O-320 engines, and seating five, first flew on 23 September 1957. It proved underpowered and was followed by a second prototype, powered by   Lycoming O-360 engines, and accommodating six seats, which first flew on 15 November 1960.

There was little interest in the IA 45 from Argentina's air taxi operators, who preferred imported American aircraft like the Piper Apache and the Aero Commander 500, and the programme was stopped in 1962, with no more production beyond the two prototypes. They continued to be flown by DIFNIA until 1966–1967, after which they were scrapped.

Variants
IA 45
Prototype powered by two Avco Lycoming O-320 piston engines, one built, first flight 23 September 1957.
IA 45B
Improved version with six seats and powered by two Lycoming O-360 piston engines, one built, first flight 15 November 1960.

Specifications (IA 45B)

References

Notes

Bibliography
 The Illustrated Encyclopedia of Aircraft (Part Work 1982-1985), 1985, Orbis Publishing
  
 

1950s Argentine civil utility aircraft
FMA aircraft
Twin-engined pusher aircraft
High-wing aircraft